Too Hot to Sleep is the seventh studio album from rock band Survivor, released in 1988. It was a relative commercial disappointment, reaching only #187 on the Billboard album charts, though "Across the Miles" is one of their biggest AC chart hits. After this album, founders Frankie Sullivan and Jim Peterik put the band on indefinite hiatus, while lead vocalist Jimi Jamison would continue to tour under the Survivor name (thus resulting in a lengthy court battle regarding rights to the name). Drummer Marc Droubay and bassist Stephen Ellis were replaced by studio musicians on the album. This album marks the final Survivor release to feature Peterik. The lineup of Sullivan and Jamison would not reunite until 2000.

This is one of the many Survivor albums briefly taken out of print in 2009. However, it was remastered and reissued in 2011 and distributed by Rock Candy Records.

Track listing

Personnel 
Survivor
 Jimi Jamison – lead vocals, backing vocals 
 Jim Peterik – keyboards
 Frankie Sullivan – guitars, backing vocals

Additional musicians
 Peter-John Vettese – keyboards
 Bill Syniar – bass 
 Mickey Curry – drums
 Ian Lloyd – backing vocals 
 Tommy Shaw – backing vocals
 Rory Dodd – additional lead vocals (7)

Production 
 Frankie Sullivan – producer 
 Frank Filipetti – producer, engineer, mixing 
 Jim Peterik – associate producer
 Jeff Abikzer – second engineer
 Dan Harjung – second engineer
 Danny Mormando – second engineer
 Doug Sax – mastering 
 Hugh Syme – art direction, cover design 
 Jay Buchsbaum – photography 
 John Baruke – management 
 Tom Consolo – management
 Frank Rand – management

Studios
 Recorded at Royal Recorders (Lake Geneva, Wisconsin) and Right Track Recording (New York City, New York).
 Mixed at Right Track Recording
 Mastered at The Mastering Lab (Hollywood, California).

References

1988 albums
Survivor (band) albums
Scotti Brothers Records albums